Henry Gregor Felsen (August 16, 1916 – March 2, 1995) was an American writer, particularly of middle grade (MG) and teen (YA) books. He wrote both under his own name and a title under the pen name of Angus Vicker.

Biography

Felsen was born and attended school in Brooklyn, the son of Harry and Sabina Bedrick Felsen. He attended the University of Iowa for two years, where he met his first wife Penny, from whom he was later divorced.

He taught part-time at Drake University (1964–1969), and in 1977 left Iowa to spend his remaining years travelling. His second wife Karen Kangas survived him, as did a son (Dan) and daughter (Holly) from his first marriage, and two stepchildren.

Career

After struggling financially during the Depression, Felsen sold nine books and hundreds of stories in his first eighteen months of full-time freelance writing in the early 1940s. After war service with the Marine Corps, during which he edited the Corps magazine Leatherneck and also wrote magazine articles while stationed in the Pacific, he returned to Iowa where he lived for most of the rest of his life.

His best-selling book was Hot Rod, one of a rodding series that also included Street Rod and Crash Club and sold about eight million copies in all. He wrote about 60 books, many of them moralistically exploring the evils of drugs, sexism and racism.

He is also credited with one screenplay, for the 1968 film Fever Heat, based on his novel of the same name which had been published under the pen name of Angus Vicker.

Bibliography

References

External links
 
 Henry Gregor Felsen bibliography
 University of Iowa Papers of Henry Gregor Felsen
 The Iowan Books – Hot Rod, new edition http://www.iowan.com/shop

1916 births
1995 deaths
American children's writers
20th-century American novelists
American male screenwriters
American young adult novelists
American male novelists
University of Iowa alumni
Drake University faculty
United States Marines
20th-century American male writers
Novelists from Iowa
Screenwriters from Iowa
20th-century American screenwriters
United States Marine Corps personnel of World War II